4Men is a South Korean rhythm and blues group formed in 1998. The group consists of three members: Haeun, Joseph, Hanbin.

Originally a four-member group composed of Yoon Min-soo, Jeong Se-young, Han Hyeon-hee and Lee Jeong-ho, 4Men released their debut album Four Men First Album on February 1, 1998. Two years later, they released their second album Ireoke Cheonildongan Moeumyeon Ibyeori Sarajindago Haetda on December 29, 2000. In 2001, Yoon Min-soo withdrew from the group, forming R&B group Vibe in 2002 with Ryu Jae-Hyun and Yoo Sung-Gyu, meanwhile 4Men continued as a three-member group until J1 joined the group in 2006. In 2008, all members withdrew from the group, Jeong Se-young and Han Hyeon-hee join and form R&B group Someday in 2009, however, although, it later disbanded in 2011, later Jeong Se Young and Yoo Sung-gyu, better known as Noblesse, join and form the r&b duo, Takeout. However, following later that year, the group was revamped with three new members: Shin Yong-jae, Kim Young-jae and Kim Won-joo. 4Men currently promotes as a duo after Kim Young-jae's withdrawal from the group in 2014.

On August 31, 2019, it was announced that Shin Yong Jae and Kim Won Joo had departed from MAJOR9 after their exclusive contracts expired and formed vocal duo, 2F. On April 5, 2021, a teaser video was released and announced that 4MEN would be making a comeback on April 14 with the single "Still". The following day, MAROR9 confirmed that the group would have a new, 4th generation lineup for the comeback, consist of Haeun, Joseph, and Hanbin.

Members
Current

 Haeun (하은) 2021-present / 4th Generation
 Joseph (요셉) 2021-present / 4th Generation
 Hanbin (한빈) 2021-present / 4th Generation

Former

 Yun Min-soo (윤민수) 1998–2001 / 1st Generation
 Jeong Se-young (정세영) 1998–2008 / 1st Generation, 2nd Generation
 Han Hyeon-hee (한현희) 1998–2008 / 1st Generation, 2nd Generation
 Lee Jeong-ho (이정호) 1998–2008 / 1st Generation, 2nd Generation
 J1 2006–2008 / 2nd Generation
 Kim Young-jae (김영재) 2008–2014 / 3rd Generation
 Shin Yong-jae (신용재) 2008–2019 / 3rd Generation
 Kim Won-joo (김원주) 2008–2019 / 3rd Generation

Discography

Studio albums

EP/Mini-albums

Compilation album 
 Baby+4Men (2015)

Live album 
 4Men 1st Live Album (2015)

Singles

Awards and nominations

References

External links 

 

K-pop music groups
South Korean contemporary R&B musical groups
South Korean boy bands
South Korean musical duos
1998 establishments in South Korea
Musical groups established in 1998
Melon Music Award winners